Elazar Abuhatzeira also known as Baba Elazar (9 August 1948 – 28 July 2011) was an Orthodox Sefardi rabbi and kabbalist in Israel.

He was born in Rissani, Morocco to Rabbi Meir and Simcha Abuhatzeira, was the grandson of the Baba Sali, Rabbi Yisrael Abuhatzeira, and the brother of Rabbi David Chai Abuhatzeira of Nahariya.

He moved to Israel in 1966 and studied at the Porat Yosef Yeshiva. He later moved to Beersheba where he ran a yeshiva. Besides from his reputation as a leading kabbalist, Abuhatzeira was known for his work and influence with business and political leaders and had a following as a spiritual leader. In 2011 he had estimated assets of $80 million.

Abuhatzeira was known for wearing a cloak whose long hood covered most of his face, reportedly to shield him from glancing at immodestly dressed women. He had a tunnel dug between his home and his yeshiva where he received people.

Abuhatzeira was married to Dvora and had seven children.

Fraud and tax evasion claims
A 1997 investigation by Yossi Bar-Moha for the Haaretz newspaper linked several incidents of corruption to Abuhatzeira, claiming that he tried to impress and persuaded people to pay him in exchange for a blessing and threatened curses. The report also claimed that Abuhatzeira's bank account contained NIS 250 million in gifts and contributions, that he had sold land designated for a girls school and was evading municipal property taxes. A police investigation was launched and in 2003 Abuhatzeira was ordered to pay NIS 100 million to the tax authority on money he received from followers. Following an appeal, a settlement was reached whereby he paid back NIS 20 million to charitable organizations. By 2004 Bar-Moha claimed that Abuhatzeira's income had grown to NIS 500 million ($141m, 2004), and he filed a joint petition with the Progressive Judaism Movement to the Israeli Supreme Court demanding the tax settlement to be cancelled, but the petition was dismissed.

In 2009 a man was indicted for threatening to kill Abuhatzeira, claiming that the rabbi made him a medical promise that had not come true and in 2010, Abuhatzeira was accused by Jews in New York of charging hundreds of thousands of dollars in exchange promised miracles that never came to fruition. The prosecutor in Brooklyn subsequently opened an investigation and Abuhatzeira stopped traveling to the United States as a result. Bar-Moha claimed "Elazar Abuhatzeira is a charlatan, conman and impostor who takes advantage of people's innocence, exploits them and brings to the verge of poverty". His disciples defended him saying that Abuhatzeira is humble and modest and would never do such a thing and insisted he used his wealth to support the poor.

Murder
Abuhatzeira was murdered on 28 July 2011 by Asher Dahan of El'ad who stabbed him in the upper body during a private audience. The 42-year-old attacker was said to have been unhappy with marital advice the rabbi had given him. Attempts were made at the scene to resuscitate him, but he was pronounced dead on arrival at the Soroka Medical Center. The funeral was held the next day in Jerusalem and was attended by tens of thousands of people, including Israel's chief rabbis, Haredi ministers and Knesset members. Eulogies were delivered at the Porat Yosef Yeshiva and in the Geula neighborhood. MK Meshulam Nahari said "who would have thought that... a rabbi could be murdered in Israel?" He is buried on the Mount of Olives. Asher Dahan was sentenced to life imprisonment for the murder.

References

1948 births
2011 deaths
Elazar
Assassinated rabbis
Moroccan emigrants to Israel
Deaths by stabbing in Israel
Sephardic Haredi rabbis in Israel
Israeli murder victims
People murdered in Israel
People from Rissani
Burials at the Jewish cemetery on the Mount of Olives
Rabbis in Beersheba